Charles Sullivan (Also known as Kamau Adilifu) is an American jazz trumpeter, composer, and bandleader. He has recorded four albums as leader. He also made recordings as a sideman with Woody Shaw, Dollar Brand, Ricky Ford, and King Curtis, among others.

Biography
Charles Sullivan was born in New York City. Growing up, Sullivan was taught how to play the trumpet from his two uncles who were both trumpet players. He went on to earn a bachelor's degree from the Manhattan School of Music in 1967. He also worked for multiple off-Broadway productions shortly before and after his graduation. In Spring of 1967 Sullivan made his first trip to Europe; a five month long tour performing with the Donald McKayle Dance Company then toured briefly as Count Basie's lead trumpeter in 1970 and with Lonnie Liston Smith in 1971. In 1974 Sullivan released his first album as bandleader titled Genesis. The album was entirely arraigned, composed, and produced by Sullivan. Throughout most of Sullivan's career he has worked intermittently on many Broadway productions and with orchestras.

Discography

As leader
 Genesis (1974, Strata-East) 
 Re-Entry (1976, Whynot)  
 Kamau (1995, Arabesque)
 Jam Session Vol. 11 (2004, SteepleChase)

As sideman
With Kenny Barron
Lucifer (Muse, 1975)
With Walter Bishop, Jr.
Illumination (1977)
With Ricky Ford
Loxodonta Africana (New World, 1977)
With Sonny Fortune
Long Before Our Mothers Cried (Strata-East, 1974)
Awakening (Horizon, 1975)
Waves of Dreams (Horizon, 1976)
With Carlos Garnett
Black Love (Muse, 1974)
With Yusef Lateef
Part of the Search (Atlantic, 1973)
With Jimmy Owens
Headin' Home (A&M/Horizon, 1978)
With Sam Rivers
Crystals (Impulse!, 1973)
With Roswell Rudd
Numatik Swing Band (1973)
With Woody Shaw
Woody III (Columbia, 1979)
With McCoy Tyner
13th House (Milestone, 1981)
Uptown/Downtown (Milestone, 1988)
The Turning Point (1991)

References

External links
Charles Sullivan on discogs

1944 births
Living people
Strata-East Records artists
Arabesque Records artists
American jazz trumpeters
American male trumpeters
Place of birth missing (living people)
21st-century trumpeters
21st-century American male musicians
American male jazz musicians